The Royal Australian Chemical Institute (RACI) is both the qualifying body in Australia for professional chemists and a learned society promoting the science and practice of chemistry in all its branches. The RACI hosts conferences, seminars and workshops. It is the professional body for chemistry in Australia, with the ability to award the status of Chartered Chemist (CChem) to suitably qualified candidates.

History
The RACI was formed as the Australian Chemical Institute in Sydney in September 1917. The driving force was David Orme Masson, professor of chemistry at the University of Melbourne. It was incorporated under the Companies Act in New South Wales in 1923. It was given a royal charter in 1932, but it was not until a supplementary royal charter in 1953 that "Royal" was added to the title of the institute. It moved to Melbourne in 1934. It was incorporated in Victoria in 2000. Since 1993, the institute has had its office at 21 Vale Street, North Melbourne, VIC 3051, Australia.

Affiliations
The RACI is a member of the Federation of Australian Scientific and Technological Societies (FASTS), and the Federation of Asian Chemical Societies (FACS).

It has branches in all states and territories in Australia and divisions for the following areas of chemistry:
Analytical and Environmental chemistry
Carbon science
Chemical education
Interfaces, Colloids and Surface science
Electrochemistry
Industrial chemistry
Inorganic chemistry
Materials chemistry
Medicinal chemistry and Chemical biology
Organic chemistry
Physical chemistry
Polymer chemistry
Radiochemistry

In 2022, the Green and Sustainable Chemistry (GASC) National Group was established.

In addition to the divisions having organised conferences, they have co-operated in running occasional national conventions since 1953.

Membership
A member of the Royal Australian Chemical Institute is designated with the honorific affix "MRACI". As the professional body for chemistry in Australia, the institute has the ability to award the status of Chartered Chemist ("CChem") to suitably qualified candidates. Election to fellow of the institute ("FRACI") is dependent on a position of eminence, services rendered, academic honours, experience and status, creative achievement, responsibility and contribution to chemical science, and recommendation by the RACI Assessment Committee. The institute also accepts undergraduate and postgraduate student members, associate members, school affiliate members, and industry affiliate members.

Publications
Chemistry in Australia is a magazine published by the RACI monthly. It contains news, reviews of books and chemical software, as well as reports and stories aimed at a broad chemical audience. It is free to read online, and also available as a hard copy for members. It was established in 1934 as the Journal and Proceedings of the Australian Chemical Institute.

The Chemical Education Division publishes the Australian Journal of Education in Chemistry. It was formally called Chemeda: The Australian Journal of Chemical Education. It includes articles on chemical education at all levels in schools and universities, including experiments from the Australasian Chemistry Enhanced Laboratory Learning (ACELL) Project.

Awards
The institute makes several annual awards including:

H. G. Smith Memorial Award 
The H. G. Smith Memorial Award is the premier award of the RACI. It is awarded annually to a member who has contributed most to the development of some branch of chemical science, judged by research work published or accepted for publication during the ten years (or equivalent relative to opportunity) preceding the award. The recipient is required to be a current member for a minimum of 3 years. If in the opinion of the RACI Board there is no candidate who has sufficient merit, the Board may refrain from making an award. Notable recipients of the award include:

 David Rivett (inaugural recipient in 1929) 
 James Arthur Prescott (1931)
 Edward Sydney Simpson (1932)
 Ian William Wark (1933)
 Francis Patrick Dwyer (1943)
 John Stuart Anderson (1944)
 Martina Stenzel (2017)

Other awards 
The Cornforth Medal for the most outstanding PhD thesis submitted by a member. It is named after the Australian Nobel Prize in Chemistry winner, Sir John Cornforth.

The Rennie Memorial Medal for the member of less than 8 years of professional experience since completing their most recent relevant qualification who has contributed most towards the development of some branch of chemical science.

The Leighton Memorial Medal is awarded to individuals in recognition of eminent services to chemistry in Australia.

The Ollé Prize for a member of the institute who submits the "best treatise, writing or paper" on any subject relevant to the institute's interests.

The Adrien Albert award recognises the enormous contributions made by Prof. Adrien Albert to medicinal chemistry. It is the premier award of the Medicinal Chemistry and Chemical Biology Division and is given for sustained, outstanding research in the field of medicinal or agricultural chemistry or chemical biology. The research upon which the award is made must be conducted wholly, or largely, within Australia and New Zealand.

See also
Australian Journal of Chemistry

References

External links

Chemistry societies
Learned societies of Australia
Scientific societies based in Australia
Scientific organisations based in Australia
Organisations based in Australia with royal patronage
Chemistry education
Scientific organizations established in 1917
1917 establishments in Australia